The 2022 DuraMAX Drydene 400 was a NASCAR Cup Series race held on May 1 and 2, 2022, at Dover Motor Speedway in Dover, Delaware. Contested over 400 laps on the 1-mile (1.6 km) concrete speedway, it was the 11th race of the 2022 NASCAR Cup Series season. The race began on Sunday, May 1, before rain delayed it to Monday, May 2, after 78 laps were complete.

Report

Background

Dover International Speedway is an oval race track in Dover, Delaware, United States that has held at least two NASCAR races since it opened in 1969. In addition to NASCAR, the track also hosted USAC and the NTT IndyCar Series. The track features one layout, a  concrete oval, with 24° banking in the turns and 9° banking on the straights. The speedway is owned and operated by Speedway Motorsports.

The track, nicknamed "The Monster Mile", was built in 1969 by Melvin Joseph of Melvin L. Joseph Construction Company, Inc., with an asphalt surface, but was replaced with concrete in 1995. Six years later in 2001, the track's capacity moved to 135,000 seats, making the track have the largest capacity of sports venue in the mid-Atlantic. In 2002, the name changed to Dover International Speedway from Dover Downs International Speedway after Dover Downs Gaming and Entertainment split, making Dover Motorsports. From 2007 to 2009, the speedway worked on an improvement project called "The Monster Makeover", which expanded facilities at the track and beautified the track. After the 2014 season, the track's capacity was reduced to 95,500 seats.

Entry list
 (R) denotes rookie driver.
 (i) denotes driver who is ineligible for series driver points.

Practice

Practice results

Qualifying

Qualifying results

Race

Stage Results

Stage One
Laps: 120

Stage Two
Laps: 130

Final Stage Results

Stage Three
Laps: 150

Race statistics
 Lead changes: 17 among 10 different drivers
 Cautions/Laps: 13 for 75 laps
 Red flags: 1 for weather
 Time of race: 3 hours, 49 minutes and 39 seconds
 Average speed:

Media

Television
Fox Sports covered the race on the television side. Mike Joy, Clint Bowyer and Larry McReynolds called the race from the broadcast booth. Jamie Little and Regan Smith handled pit road for the television side.

Radio
MRN had the radio call for the race and was also simulcasted on Sirius XM NASCAR Radio. This would be the final Dover race covered by MRN Radio, radio rights shifted to PRN for 2023 onwards.

Standings after the race

Drivers' Championship standings

Manufacturers' Championship standings

Note: Only the first 16 positions are included for the driver standings.
. – Driver has clinched a position in the NASCAR Cup Series playoffs.

References

DuraMAX Drydene 400
DuraMAX Drydene 400
NASCAR races at Dover Motor Speedway
DuraMAX Drydene 400